= William Zamer =

- Scientific career
- Fields: Biology

William E. Zamer is an American biologist at National Science Foundation and an Elected Fellow of the Association for the Advancement of Science.
